Dydiowa  (Dydiova) is a former village in the administrative district of Gmina Lutowiska, within Bieszczady County, Subcarpathian Voivodeship, in south-eastern Poland, on the border with Ukraine.

The village of Dydiowa was founded in 1529 by the Cracow voivode Peter Kmita. In 1589 a church was built in the village.

References 

Villages in Bieszczady County
Populated places established in 1529